Skjold is a village in Målselv Municipality in Troms og Finnmark county, Norway. The village of Holmen lies just east of Skjold.

The Skjold army base is located just north of the village of Skjold.  It is home to the Brigade Nord (Northern brigade) of the Norwegian Army.

The village was the administrative centre of the old municipality of Øverbygd which existed from 1925 until its dissolution in 1964.

References

Villages in Troms
Målselv
Populated places of Arctic Norway